Paola Alejandra Grandón González (born 29 August 1973) is a Chilean activist who is member of the Chilean Constitutional Convention.

Political career
In the Convention, she is part of the Commission of Budget and Interior Administration.

See also
 List of members of the Chilean Constitutional Convention

References

External links
 Profile at Chile Constituyente

Living people
Social Green Regionalist Federation politicians
21st-century Chilean politicians
Members of the Chilean Constitutional Convention
21st-century Chilean women politicians
1973 births